Malcolm Crook is Professor of French history at Keele University and is editor of the journal French History.

He is also a trustee of the Historical Association and The Society for the Study of French History.

Bibliography
Elections in the French Revolution, 1789-1799 (Cambridge University Press, 1996)
Napoleon Comes to Power, 1795-1804 (University of Wales Press, 1998)
Revolutionary France 1788-1880 (Oxford University Press, 2002)

References

Living people
Academics of Keele University
English historians
Year of birth missing (living people)
History journal editors